Germán Sánchez may refer to:

 Germán Sánchez (racewalker) (born 1967), Mexican race walker
 Germán Sánchez (footballer) (born 1986), Spanish footballer
 Germán Sánchez (racing driver) (born 1989), Spanish racing driver
 Germán Sánchez (diver) (born 1992), Mexican diver
 German Sánchez (skier) (born 1972), Mexican Olympic skier

See also 
 Germán Sierra Sánchez (born 1956), Mexican politician